2000–01 NEBL was the third complete season of the North European Basketball League. There were 31 teams, from 19 countries  participating in the 2001–02 season's tournament. Apart from clubs from Northern, Central and Eastern Europe, clubs from Southern Europe (Bulgaria, Macedonia, Romania, Serbia), Israel and Turkey participated for the first time in this competition.

Lietuvos rytas won the tournament by defeating Ural Great in the final.

Regular season

Second round 

Group C

Group D

Group E

Group F

Source:  ural-great.ru

Final Four 
Source:  ural-great.ru

References 

2000
2001–02 in European basketball leagues
2001–02 in Lithuanian basketball
2001–02 in Latvian basketball
2001–02 in Swedish basketball
2001–02 in Estonian basketball
2001–02 in Finnish basketball
2001 in Danish sport
2002 in Danish sport
2001–02 in German basketball
2001–02 in Russian basketball
2001–02 in Ukrainian basketball
2001–02 in Czech basketball
2001 in English sport
2002 in English sport
2001–02 in Dutch basketball
2001–02 in Polish basketball
2002 in Norwegian sport
2001–02 in Belarusian basketball
2001–02 in Georgian basketball